Maryamaweet (also Romanised as Mariamwit) is an Ethiopian name meaning "Mother Mary's image", or "Mother Mary's identity."  Maryamaweet has a nickname: Maryam, and sometimes Mary. Sometimes Maryam is one whole name. Maryamaweet is also a historical bible name in the Ethiopian Orthodox Church's scriptures.  All over Ethiopia, and sometimes in America, many girls are called Maryamaweet.

References

Amharic-language names